The Ken Bridge is a road bridge about  north east of New Galloway in Dumfries and Galloway, Scotland, which carries the A712 road over the Water of Ken towards Balmaclellan. Designed by John Rennie shortly before his death, it has been designated a Category A listed building.

History
Built between 1821 and 1822 to a design by John Rennie, it replaced an earlier bridge in the same location, also by Rennie, which was completed in 1811 but destroyed by flooding shortly afterwards. Rennie died on 4 October 1821, before the construction of the bridge was complete.

Description
The bridge is entirely made of granite ashlar, roughly finished for the most part, with polished granite surfaces on the inner faces of the parapet and on the soffits. Its piers are supported on the riverbed by round-nosed cutwaters, and the spandrels between the arches are decorated with pilasters.

The bridge has been praised for its aesthetic qualities. Architectural historian John Gifford, writing in the Dumfries and Galloway volume of the Pevsner Architectural Guides series, described it as a "long elegant curve of granite ashlar", and John R. Hume, the former chief inspector of historic buildings for Historic Scotland, wrote that it was the "most elegant of Rennie's bridges in the South-West... ...five graded segmental arches leap the Ken's floodplain in a long, low streamlined curve."

The bridge now carries the A712 road towards Balmaclellan. It was designated a Category A listed building in 1971.

References

Sources

Category A listed buildings in Dumfries and Galloway
Road bridges in Scotland
19th-century establishments in Scotland
Bridges completed in 1821